Qeshlaq-e Akhmud may refer to:
 Qeshlaq-e Akhmud-e Olya
 Qeshlaq-e Akhmud-e Sofla
 Qeshlaq-e Akhmud-e Vosta